Chiaroscuro is the second studio album by Australian rock band Ocean Alley, released on 9 March 2018. The album debuted at number 15 on the Australian ARIA Albums Chart following its release. The album was supported by a national tour.

At the J Awards of 2018, the album was nominated for Australian Album of the Year.

In December 2018, the album was voted at No. 2 on Triple J's Top 10 Albums of 2018.

In 2018, "The Comedown", was voted into Triple J's Hottest 100 of 2017 at #48, whilst in 2019, "Confidence", "Knees" and "Happy Sad" were voted into Triple J's Hottest 100 of 2018 at numbers 1, 10 and 100, respectively. "Bones" was also voted into the Hottest 200 of 2018 at #166.

Reception
Riley Fitzgerald from Music Feeds said "Chiaroscuro is a big, spacious record. 12 tracks arrive crammed full of hooks and loaded with riffs. A radio-friendly rock sound with funk and reggae undercurrents." An ABC staff writer called the album "a sun drenched, genre bending delight".
RJ Frometa from Vents Magazine said "Chiaroscuro explores the contrast of light and dark, from the hazy, hopeful tones on the paradoxical 'Happy Sad', to the wistful yet commanding howls on 'Knees', and warm, rich rolling guitars on single 'The Comedown'... Each song is drenched in equal parts distortion and dreaminess, pairing blissfully scuzzy riffs with intoxicating echoing vocals, to create the ultimate fusion of psychedelic reggae and laid-back surf rock." Emma Salisbury from The Music wrote: "As the album's title suggests, this work explores both light and shade. In a confident step forward, Ocean Alley have crafted a seamless blend of the two within their constantly evolving melting pot of psychedelic and surf rock." A staff writer from The Newcastle Herald called the album "a stunning collection of ebbing and flowing tracks; full of slinky bass riffs, epic harmonies and soaring guitar solos."

Track listing

Charts

Weekly charts

Year-end charts

Certifications

Release history

References 

2018 albums
Ocean Alley albums
Sony Music Australia albums